Preah Sihanouk Municipality, also Krong Preah Sihanouk, is one of the four districts of Sihanoukville Province in Cambodia.  In 1998, it had an urban population of 67,440. In addition to the city of Sihanoukville and the Sihanoukville Autonomous Port, the islands Koh Puos, Koh Preab, Koh Doung, Koh Kaong Kang, Koh Tres, Koh Koun, Koh Tuich, Koh Rong, and Koh Rong Sanloem are under Sihanoukville’s administration.

See also
 Ream National Park

References

External links
 Ministry of Tourism
 National Institute of Statistics of Cambodia
 Sihanoukville Autonomous Port
 Ministry of Public Works and Transport

Districts of Sihanoukville province